Tibor Püspöki (1 June 1900 – 21 January 1978) was a Hungarian hurdler. He competed in the men's 110 metres hurdles at the 1924 Summer Olympics.

References

External links
 

1900 births
1978 deaths
Athletes (track and field) at the 1924 Summer Olympics
Athletes (track and field) at the 1928 Summer Olympics
Hungarian male hurdlers
Hungarian male long jumpers
Olympic athletes of Hungary
Place of birth missing